The Aquinian is a student-owned-and-operated publication at St. Thomas University (STU) in Fredericton, New Brunswick, Canada. The Aquinian is published on a weekly basis during the regular academic year and is a member of the Canadian University Press.

The Aquinians mission is to "foster a sense of community at STU by developing and promoting dialogue." The Aquinian provides the campus community with an educational, informative and worthwhile presentation of STU and the greater Fredericton communities in newsprint form.

Recent history
Before the 2004–05 academic year, The Aquinian was printed biweekly in broadsheet format. In the fall of 2004, the editorial staff scaled the paper down to tabloid format, which made it financially feasible to print on a weekly basis. In 2020, due to COVID-19 pandemic, The Aquinian stopped its weekly printing schedule to transition to fully digital, where staff now publish stories on a weekly basis on its website.

The Aquinian has a friendly, good-natured rivalry with The Brunswickan, the campus newspaper for the University of New Brunswick, which is also located on Fredericton's campus hill.

Controversies
 2004–05 academic year

St. Thomas University gained international headlines in the fall of 2004 when the paper published a photo taken of four University of New Brunswick (UNB) rugby players streaking across the university's rugby pitch. The incident generated huge interest in the paper among students, as well as regional, national and international media. It was also a controversy among UNB students and administration as the four players captured in the photo were suspended from playing in the Maritime men's university rugby championship, which the team went on to lose.   The four players in the photo were among at least ten who partook in the bare festivities.  

 2005–06 academic year
The paper's content came under fire in the 2005–06 academic year after it published an opinion piece on student apathy towards the U.S.-led invasion of Iraq. It was accompanied by a photograph of a dead Iraqi soldier who had allegedly been run over by a tank. The image was taken from the controversial website, nowthatsfuckedup.com.
The paper came under further scrutiny after publishing a questionable column on fitness ("Low Resolution") by then-arts editor Max Maxwell. In the piece, he made several incorrect assumptions about his primary subject. One apparent problem turned out to be a simile comparing the student's willpower to that of a donkey, chasing a carrot. Many misread the phrase as having described the main subject as looking like a donkey. A brief controversy arose when the student then disposed of several copies of the issue in which the piece was printed, instructed to do so by Sofia Rodriguez Gallagher, the president of the St. Thomas University Students' Union at the time. Maxwell was given the choice to either resign or be fired.

 2012–13 academic year

The paper generated a significant amount of negative attention following articles printed with regards to the resignation of a Students' Union Vice-president. The writer of said articles had been accused of prying into the personal life of the vice-president, reporting rumours and speculation as fact and citing unprofessional sources. When asked for an apology by the Students' Representative Council, its Editor-in-Chief at the time, Liam McGuire, refused and maintained that the writer had done nothing wrong.

Editor in Chief
 2022–present: Aaron Sousa
 2021–22: Hannah Rudderham
 2020–21: Diana Chávez
 2019–20: Caitlin Dutt
 2018–19: Sarah Morin
 2017–18: Angela Bosse
 2016–17: Hadeel Ibrahim
 2015–16: Joseph Tunney
 2014–15: MacKenzie Riley
 2013–14: Ian Leblanc
 2012–13: Liam McGuire
 2011–12: Alyssa Mosher
 2010–11: Tara Chislett
 2009–10: Matt McCann
 2008–09: Bailey White
 2007–08: Nick Moore
 2006–07: Kate Wright
 2005–06: Justin Sadler
 2004–05: Miriam Christensen
 2002–04: Carmy Joseph
 2002–02: Kyle Hanniman
 2001–02: Andrew MacDonald

Managing Editor
 2022–present: Brooklyn Wilkins
 2021–22: Hana Delaney
 2020–21: Jasmine Gidney
 2019–20: Jerry-Faye Flatt
 2018–19: Cassidy Chisholm
 2001–02: Greg Mercer

See also
 List of student newspapers in Canada
 List of newspapers in Canada

References

External links
 theaquinian.net

Notes
 "University suspends naked rugby players" CBC News, Friday, November 5, 2004 http://www.cbc.ca/canada/story/2004/11/05/rugby_naked041105.html
 "Rugby team may end naked celebrations" Canadian Press, November 5, 2004, https://archive.today/20070623032604/http://cnews.canoe.ca/CNEWS/WeirdNews/2004/11/05/702161.html

Student newspapers published in New Brunswick
Newspapers published in Fredericton
St. Thomas University (New Brunswick)
Newspapers established in 1935
1935 establishments in New Brunswick
Weekly newspapers published in New Brunswick